Ni Zhiliang (October 1900 – December 15, 1965) was a People's Republic of China diplomat and People's Liberation Army lieutenant general. He was the 1st People's Republic of China Ambassador to North Korea (1950–1952). He joined the Communist Party of China in October 1926 and participated in the Guangzhou Uprising. In May 1928, he went to the border region of Hubei, Henan and Anhui. During the Second Sino-Japanese War, he was a member of the Eighth Route Army, serving in Shanxi, Hebei and Henan. In October 1945 he went to Northeast China. He died in Beijing.

1900 births
1965 deaths
People's Liberation Army generals from Beijing
Ambassadors of China to North Korea
Chinese Red Army generals
Members of the 4th Chinese People's Political Consultative Conference
Chinese Communist Party politicians from Beijing
People's Republic of China politicians from Beijing